= Vyankatesh Asarkar =

Indian flute player and manufacturer

Vyankatesh Asarkar (Marathi: व्यंकटेश आसरकर), commonly known as Dadasaheb Asarkar (15 Dec 1895–15 May 1965) was an Indian flute player and a flute manufacturer.
